Terrance "Terry" Denison (born c. 1947) was a member of the Ottawa City Council, in Ottawa, Ontario, representing the Queensboro Ward from 1981 to 1985.

History

Terrance Denison, a graduate in common law from the University of Ottawa, was first elected to the Ottawa City Council in 1980, and re-elected in 1982.  He later became a senior solicitor for the City of Toronto government.

References

Living people
Ottawa city councillors
University of Ottawa alumni
Year of birth uncertain
Place of birth missing (living people)
Year of birth missing (living people)